Raymundo Sánchez y Capetillo, known as Raymundo Capetillo (1 September 1943 – 12 July 2020), was a Mexican theater, film, television and radio actor. He was also an economist by profession and an English teacher.

Career
Capetillo started out as an actor in the late 1960s, worked in television, film and theater.

He was admitted to the San Ángel Inn hospital in Mexico City on 5 July 2020, due to respiratory problems. He died a week later, on 12 July, at the age of 76, from complications of COVID-19 during the COVID-19 pandemic in Mexico.

Filmography

Telenovelas 
 1969 - De la tierra a la luna
 1971 - Muchacha italiana viene a casarse
 1974 - Ana del aire
 1977 - La venganza .... Eduardo 
 1978 - Mamá Campanita .... Gabriel Carbajal
 1978 - Viviana .... Alfonso Cernuda
 1980 - Aprendiendo a amar .... Hugo
 1983 - Un solo corazón .... Roberto
 1983 - La fiera .... Marcial Urquiza
 1985 - Juana Iris .... Rafael
 1987 - Victoria .... Joaquín de los Santos
 1987 - Rosa salvaje .... Doctor Reynaldo
 1989 - El hombre que debe morir .... Dr. Ciro Valdez
 1991 - Cadenas de amargura .... Renato Garza
 1992 - Mágica juventud .... Ernesto Grimaldi
 1996 - Marisol .... Diego Montalvo
 1997 - No tengo madre .... Norberto Nerón 
 1998 - Soñadoras .... Horacio de la Macorra
 1999 - Alma rebelde
 1999 - Mujeres engañadas .... Ramiro
 2000 - Cuento de Navidad .... Invitado en la lucha libre
 2000 - Mi destino eres tú .... Sergio Rivadeneira
 2001 - El manantial .... Dr. Álvaro Luna 
 2003 - Velo de novia .... Filemón Paz
 2004 - Corazones al límite .... Daniel Molina
 2005 - Barrera de amor .... Nicolás Linares 
 2007 - Pasión .... Justo Darién
 2009 - Corazón salvaje .... Raúl de Marín
 2012 - Amor bravío .... Francisco Javier Díaz Velasco
 2013 - Mentir para vivir .... Juez Edmundo Valencia

Television 
 2002 - Mujer, casos de la vida real
 2007 - La rosa de Guadalupe .... Gonzalo
 2008 - Mujeres asesinas .... Mariano Dávila
 2012 - Como dice el dicho .... Álvaro

Film 
 1969 - Rosas blancas para mi hermana negra
 1970 - La hermanita Dinamita
 1973 - El amor tiene cara de mujer
 1973 - Los perros de Dios
 1975 - Santo en Anónimo mortal

Theatre 
 Sigue tu onda
 Morirás desnudo
 Mame
 Ensalada de Nochebuena
 Ifigenia en Áulide
 Juguetes para un matrimonio
 Ensalada de amantes
 Como tú me deseas
 Entre pitones te veas
 Billy
 El monstruo sagrado
 Aprendiendo a ser señora
 Don Juan Tenorio
 El pozo de la soledad
 Cena de matrimonios
 La llorona
 Sexualidades
 El cerco de la cabra dorada
 Eduardo II de Inglaterra
 Agosto
 Un amante sin vergüenza

References

External links
 

1943 births
2020 deaths
Mexican male telenovela actors
Mexican male television actors
Mexican male film actors
Mexican male stage actors
Male actors from Mexico City
Deaths from the COVID-19 pandemic in Mexico